BRL  may refer to:
Braille the method of reading and writing system that can be read without sight
 Brazilian real, the currency of Brazil, by ISO 4217 code
Ballistic Research Laboratory, a United States Army organization
 Brisbane Rugby League, the predecessor to the Queensland Cup rugby league competition in Queensland, Australia
BRL V6, a Dutch car racing competition
BRL Light, a Dutch car racing competition
 Breakroom Live with Maron & Seder, an internet-only political talk show hosted by Air America Media
Southeast Iowa Regional Airport (IATA airport code: BRL), a public airport near Burlington, Iowa
 Burlington, Iowa (Amtrak station), United States; Amtrak station code BRL
Bristol Robotics Laboratory, a UK robotics facility